Phaedrysmocheilus is a genus of Early Triassic Tainoceratids (Nautiloidea, Cephalopoda) from Siberia. The shell is a rapidly expanding, moderately involute nautilicone; smooth in the adult stage but laterally ribbed in the juvenile stage. Volutions are convex laterally, arched ventrally, embraced dorsally.  Whorl sections change during development from being slightly depressed, early, to slightly compressed later, changing from being relatively wide to relatively high.  The umbilicus is deep and funnel shaped. Sutures are slightly sinuous.

References

 Bernhard Kummerl, 1964.  Nautiloidea-Nautilida.  Treatise on Invertebrate Paleontology Part K. Geological Society of America and University of Kansas Press. 
 Phaedrysmocheilus, Paleobiology Database   
 J.J. Sepkoski, 2002. List of Cephalopod genera. 

Prehistoric nautiloid genera
Nautiloids